The 1952–53 Cypriot First Division was the 16th season of the Cypriot top-level football league.

Overview
It was contested by 8 teams, and AEL Limassol won the championship.

League standings

Results

References
Cyprus - List of final tables (RSSSF)

1
Cypriot First Division, 1952-53

Cypriot First Division seasons